Well engineering consists of engineering facilitating the design and construction of a well. It is based on pore pressure, kick tolerance, casing functions, casing design and cementing. It is sometimes related to drilling and petroleum engineering.

Overview
Study of formation pressures is important for the safe planning of a well. Values of formation pressures are used to design safe mud weights to overcome fracturing the formation and prevent well kicks.

See also
 Petroleum engineering
 Drilling
 Oil well
 Well logging

References

Drilling technology